Baron Lajos Simonyi de Barbács et Vitézvár (13 April 1824 – 12 December 1894) was a Hungarian politician, who served as Minister of Agriculture, Industry and Trade between 1875 and 1876. He studied law in Kassa. From 1847 he was a delegate on the Diet in Pest. He participated in the Hungarian Revolution of 1848, he performed courier service besides Artúr Görgey. As a result, he was imprisoned for a short time. Later he was a supporter of László Teleki. Simonyi retired from politics in 1878.

References
 Magyar Életrajzi Lexikon
 PIM OPAC

1824 births
1894 deaths
Politicians from Ternopil
People from the Kingdom of Galicia and Lodomeria
Agriculture ministers of Hungary
19th-century Hungarian politicians